Anduqan (also Romanized as Āndūqān and Andeqān) is a village in Chahardeh Sankhvast Rural District, Jolgeh Sankhvast District, Jajrom County, North Khorasan Province, Iran. At the 2006 census, its population was 554, in 162 families.

References 

Populated places in Jajrom County